Kawitharabi Thiri-Pawara Agga-Maha-Dhammarazadiraza-Guru, commonly known as Dhanyawaddy Ayedawbon is a Burmese chronicle covering the history of Arakan from time immemorial to Konbaung Dynasty's annexation of Mrauk-U Kingdom in 1785. It was written soon after the annexation to salvage Arakanese history after most of Mrauk-U's historical records were burned down by Konbaung forces in 1785. Rakhine Sayadaw, a Buddhist monk, tried to piece together the portions that escaped the indiscriminate destruction, and completed it in 1788. According to G.E. Harvey, a British colonial period historian, the chronicle may not be as reliable as it is "a third-hand piece of work".

The chronicle covers from c. 825 BCE from the reign of legendary King Kanyaza Gyi to the Konbaung annexation in 1785. Like most Arakanese chronicles, this chronicle provides a short account of legendary kings, and starts a more detailed coverage with King Sanda Thuriya (146–198). It also contains many homilies and wise counsels on good governance given to various kings by wise men and ministers. It provides the most detailed accounts, starting with King Pa-Gyi (Min Bin) to the last king of Arakan, Maha Thammada.

References

Bibliography
 
 
 

Burmese chronicles
1788 non-fiction books
18th-century history books
Burmese Buddhist texts